The New York Museum was a short-lived dime museum at 210 Bowery in Manhattan, New York City, operating from the early 1880s to 1896. Managed by a Louis Hickman, it was refused a licence in 1883, and investigated for gambling and child prostitution in 1884, but remained in business. In 1889 it became the Fairyland Dime Museum and closed in 1896.

References 

Defunct museums in New York City
1896 disestablishments in New York (state)
Bowery
1880s establishments in New York (state)
Nolita